The Islamic Republic of Iran Volleyball Federation (I.R.I.V.F.) is the governing body for Volleyball in Iran. It was founded in 1945, and has been a member of FIVB. It was a part of Iranian Basketball Federation till 1957. It is also a member of the Asian Volleyball Confederation. The IRIVF is responsible for organizing the Iran men's national volleyball team and Iran women's national volleyball team.

Previous Presidents 
1- Amir Abbas Amin (1957–1963)

2- Kazem Rahbari (1963–1967)

3- Ali Akbar Mirfakhraei (1967–1968)

4- Kamal Khanli (1968–1969)

5- Fereidoun Farrokhnia (1969–1972)

6- Mehdi Khazaei (1972–1974)

7- Farhad Masoudi (1974–1978)

8- Manouchehr Shapouri (1978–1979)

9- Mahmoud Adl (1979–1980)

10- Gholamreza Jabbari (1980–1981)

11- Jaber Khalafzadeh (1981–1982)

12- Hossein Alirezaei (1982–1984)

13- Gholamreza Jabbari (1984–1987)

14- Parviz Khaki (1987–1990)

15- Mohammad Reza Yazdani-Khorram (1990–2006)

16- Mohammad Reza Davarzani (2006–2017)

17- Ahmad Ziaei (2017–2018)

18- Afshin Davari (Acting) (2018-2019)

19- Ali Fattahi (Acting) (2019)

20- Mohammad Reza Davarzani (2019–Present)

References
  Iran Volleyball History

National members of the Asian Volleyball Confederation
Volleyball federation|Volleyball